Guy Owen Wilkerson (December 21, 1899 – July 15, 1971) was an American actor, known primarily for his roles in Western B movies, who with his tall, lanky frame, he often played sidekick or comedy relief parts.

Biography 
Wilkseron was born December 21, 1899, in Whitewright, Texas. He was a former vaudevillian and burlesque performer when he began making films in 1937.

He was one-third of the Texas Rangers in the Rangers series of films, alongside Dave O'Brien in all 22 of the film's series from 1942 to 1945. James Newill was his other co-star in the first 14 of the series. Tex Ritter replaced Jim for the concluding eight entries in the series.

Wilkerson played Panhandle Perkins in all 22 films. He later made the move to television, appearing in shows such as The Lone Ranger, The Twilight Zone, Thriller, Maverick, Gunsmoke, The Fugitive, Kentucky Jones, Green Acres, and Adam-12. Wilkerson died July 15, 1971, in Hollywood, California.

Selected filmography 

 Paradise Express (1937) - Skinny Smith
 Mountain Justice (1937) - Asaph Anderson
 Yodelin' Kid from Pine Ridge (1937) - Turpentiner Zeke
 Mountain Music (1937) - Medicine Show Spectator (uncredited)
 Heart of the Rockies (1937) - Dawson Clan Member
 Wife, Doctor and Nurse (1937) - Assistant Delivery Man (uncredited)
 Gold Is Where You Find It (1938) - Vocal Farmer (uncredited)
 Kentucky Moonshine (1938) - Townsman (uncredited)
 Professor Beware (1938) - Shoeshine Customer (uncredited)
 Down in 'Arkansaw' (1938) - Townsman (uncredited)
 The Cowboy and the Lady (1938) - Rodeo Cowboy (uncredited)
 Dodge City (1939) - Man Wanting Revenge by Hanging (uncredited)
 Forged Passport (1939) - Jim - Servant-Henchman (uncredited)
 Man of Conquest (1939) - Texican (uncredited)
 Our Neighbors – The Carters (1939) - Father (uncredited)
 Gone with the Wind (1939) - Wounded Card Player (uncredited)
 Untamed (1940) - Sim Jarvis (uncredited)
 Sergeant York (1941) - Tom (uncredited)
 Spooks Run Wild (1941) - Constable
 Birth of the Blues (1941) - Man Outside of Jail (uncredited)
 Swamp Woman (1941) - Abner Enderberry
 Captain Midnight (1942, Serial) - Ichabod 'Icky' Mudd
 Juke Girl (1942) - Bean Picker (uncredited)
 Beyond the Blue Horizon (1942) - Husband at Circus (uncredited)
 The Pride of the Yankees (1942) - Sportsman at Ballgame (uncredited)
 Vengeance of the West (1942) - Long John
 The Rangers Take Over (1942) - Texas Ranger Panhandle Perkins
 Bad Men of Thunder Gap (1943) - Panhandle Perkins
 Hangmen Also Die! (1943) - Santrock (uncredited)
 Henry Aldrich Gets Glamour (1943) - Mac - Western Union Messenger (uncredited)
 West of Texas (1943) - Panhandle Perkins
 Border Buckaroos (1943) - Panhandle Perkins
 Fighting Valley (1943) - Panhandle Perkins
 Trail of Terror (1943) - Panhandle Perkins
 The Unknown Guest (1943) - Man in Sheriff's Party (uncredited)
 The Return of the Rangers (1943) - Panhandle Perkins
 Boss of Rawhide (1943) - Panhandle Perkins
 Outlaw Roundup (1944) - Panhandle Perkins
 Guns of the Law (1944) - Panhandle Perkins
 The Pinto Bandit (1944) - Panhandle Perkins
 Spook Town (1944) - Panhandle Perkins
 Brand of the Devil (1944) - Panhandle Perkins
 Gunsmoke Mesa (1944) - Panhandle Perkins
 Gangsters of the Frontier (1944) - Panhandle Perkins
 Dead or Alive (1944) - Panhandle Perkins
 The Whispering Skull (1944) - Panhandle Perkins
 Marked for Murder (1945) - Texas Ranger Panhandle Perkins
 Enemy of the Law (1945) - Panhandle Perkins
 Three in the Saddle (1945) - Panhandle Perkins
 Frontier Fugitives (1945) - Panhandle Perkins
 Flaming Bullets (1945) - Panhandle Perkins
 The Royal Mounted Rides Again (1945, Serial) - Citizen Visiting Nelson (uncredited)
 Captain Tugboat Annie (1945) - Jenkins
 Abilene Town (1946) - Fan-Tan Player with 'Bravo' Trimble (uncredited)
 The Scarlet Horseman (1946, Serial) - Henchman Panhandle
 The Spider Woman Strikes Back (1946) - Lem - Rancher (uncredited)
 Duel in the Sun (1946) - Dance-Floor Cowboy (uncredited)
 California (1947) - Stranger (uncredited)
 The Michigan Kid (1947) - Shotgun Messenger (uncredited)
 The Sea of Grass (1947) - Brewton Ranch Hand (uncredited)
 Danger Street (1947) - Jake - Caretaker (uncredited)
 Unconquered (1947) - Frontiersman (uncredited)
 That Hagen Girl (1947) - Link - Janitor (uncredited)
 Big Town After Dark (1947) - Newspaper Building Custodian (uncredited)
 The Man from Texas (1948) - Townsman (uncredited)
 Fury at Furnace Creek (1948) - Court Clerk (uncredited)
 Speed to Spare (1948) - Pop, Trucker's Cafe Owner (uncredited)
 Texas, Brooklyn & Heaven (1948) - Thibault (uncredited)
 Red River (1948) - Pete (uncredited)
 The Plunderers (1948) - Loafer Townsman (uncredited)
 The Decision of Christopher Blake (1948) - Stage Doorman (uncredited)
 The Sun Comes Up (1949) - Farmer Volunteering to Take in Six Orphans (uncredited)
 The Walking Hills (1949) - Cowhand (uncredited)
 Red Stallion in the Rockies (1949) - Rancher (uncredited)
 The Girl from Jones Beach (1949) - Relaxing Janitor (uncredited)
 Roseanna McCoy (1949) - A Hatfield (uncredited)
 Woman in Hiding (1950) - Searcher in Rowboat (uncredited)
 Comanche Territory (1950) - Barfly Talking to Katie (uncredited)
 A Ticket to Tomahawk (1950) - Dr. Brink (uncredited)
 Please Believe Me (1950) - Rural Mailman (uncredited)
 Return of the Frontiersman (1950) - Prisoner (uncredited)
 Winchester '73 (1950) - Virgil Earp (uncredited)
 Wyoming Mail (1950) - Townsman (uncredited)
 Mr. Music (1950) - Actor in Show (uncredited)
 Stage to Tucson (1950) - Tom - Stage Driver (uncredited)
 The Great Missouri Raid (1951) - Clell Miller
 Santa Fe (1951) - Depot Clerk (uncredited)
 The Fat Man (1951) - Justice of the Peace (uncredited)
 Along the Great Divide (1951) - Jury Foreman (uncredited)
 Passage West (1951) - Frontiersman in Wagon (uncredited)
 Comin' Round the Mountain (1951) - Uncle Clem McCoy
 Mr. Belvedere Rings the Bell (1951) - Kramer (uncredited)
 The Red Badge of Courage (1951) - Veteran (uncredited)
 Drums in the Deep South (1951) - Confederate Sentry (uncredited)
 Scandal Sheet (1952) - Janitor (uncredited)
 Carbine Williams (1952) - Prisoner (uncredited)
 The San Francisco Story (1952) - Man in Jail (uncredited)
 The Story of Will Rogers (1952) - Townsman (uncredited)
 The Big Sky (1952) - Henchman Longface (uncredited)
 The Legend of the Lone Ranger (1952) - Deputy Corey (uncredited)
 All I Desire (1953) - Clem (uncredited)
 The Last Posse (1953) - George Romer
 The Man from the Alamo (1953) - Rifleman (uncredited)
 The Mississippi Gambler (1953) - Ike - Station Agent (uncredited)
 Take the High Ground! (1953) - Carey's Father (uncredited)
 Those Redheads from Seattle (1953) - Wandering Willie (uncredited)
 Crime Wave (1953) - Beer-Drinker at Counter (uncredited)
 The Boy from Oklahoma (1954) - Huey Mitchell (uncredited)
 Ma and Pa Kettle at Home (1954) - Jones (uncredited)
 The Far Country (1954) - Tanana Pete (uncredited)
 Wyoming Renegades (1955) - Stagecoach Driver (uncredited)
 Foxfire (1955) - Mr. Barton (uncredited)
 One Desire (1955) - Marshal Coe (uncredited)
 Lucy Gallant (1955) - Painter (uncredited)
 I'll Cry Tomorrow (1955) - Barfly (uncredited)
 Ransom! (1956) - Farmer at Roadside (uncredited)
 Meet Me in Las Vegas (1956) - Slim (uncredited)
 Jubal (1956) - Cookie (uncredited)
 You Can't Run Away from It (1956) - Herdsman (scenes deleted)
 Shoot-Out at Medicine Bend (1957) - Loafer (uncredited)
 The Buster Keaton Story (1957) - Boarder
 Band of Angels (1957) - Minister (uncredited)
 3:10 to Yuma (1957) - Hotel Proprietor-Bartender (uncredited)
 Decision at Sundown (1957) - Abe (uncredited)
 Cowboy (1958) - Peggy - Trail Hand-Cook (uncredited)
 Wild Heritage (1958) - Chaco - Trail Drive Cook
 Man of the West (1958) - Train Conductor (uncredited)
 The Hanging Tree (1959) - Townsman Who Sells Cabib (uncredited)
 No Name on the Bullet (1959) - Farmer (uncredited)
 The FBI Story (1959) - Cliff Eberhardt (uncredited)
 Toby Tyler (1960) - Townsman (uncredited)
 Elmer Gantry (1960) - Janitor in Revival Tent (uncredited)
 Seven Ways from Sundown (1960) - Townsman of Beeker's Crossing (uncredited)
 The Walking Target (1960) - Lank (uncredited)
 Susan Slade (1961) - Slim
 Moon Pilot (1962) - Conventioneer in Elevator (uncredited)
 To Kill a Mockingbird (1962) - Jury Foreman (uncredited)
 Spencer's Mountain (1963) - Slim Temple (uncredited)
 The Haunted Palace (1963) - Gideon Leach / Mr. Leach
 The Brass Bottle (1964) - Client (uncredited)
 Your Cheatin' Heart (1964) - The Minister (uncredited)
 War Party (1965) - Wooden Face
 Black Spurs (1965) - Henry
 Harlow (1965) - Comic Hunter (uncredited)
 Never Too Late (1965) - Plant Foreman (uncredited)
 The Silencers (1966) - Farmer (uncredited)
 Alvarez Kelly (1966) - Jailer (uncredited)
 Good Times (1967) - Deputy (uncredited)
 True Grit (1969) - The Hangman (uncredited)
 The Great Bank Robbery (1969) - Glazier (uncredited)
 Hello, Dolly! (1969) - Laborer (uncredited)
 There Was a Crooked Man... (1970) - Prisoner In Solitary (uncredited)
 Monte Walsh (1970) - Old Man (uncredited)
 The Todd Killings (1971) - Mr. Carpenter (final film role)

Selected Television

External links 

1899 births
1971 deaths
20th-century American male actors
American male film actors
People from Whitewright, Texas